Extreme Records is an Australia-based record label.

The label was founded by Ulex Xane and initially specialised in underground experimental and industrial cassettes. Roger Richards became involved in 1987 and eventually became the label’s director after Xane's departure.

List of releases

See also
 List of record labels

External links
Extreme Records Official Site
Interview with Rogers Richards of Extreme Records - small WORLD Podcast 2007

Australian record labels
Noise music record labels
Industrial record labels
Experimental music record labels
Electronic music record labels